"Ol' Rag Blues" is a song recorded by the British rock band Status Quo. It was included on the album Back to Back in 1983, and also released as a single. It was the only top 10 single the band never played live.

"Ol' Rag Blues" originally had a lead vocal by Alan Lancaster; however, the final recording used for this single featured a lead vocal performance by Francis Rossi. Lancaster wrote the song with Keith Lamb, lead singer of British bands The Kase, Sleepy Talk and Mr. Toad, and founder and lead singer of Australian glam rock band Hush.

Track listing

7-inch 
 "Ol' Rag Blues" (Lancaster/Lamb) (2.51)
 "Stay The Night" (Rossi/Miller/Frost) (3.20)

12-inch 
 "Ol' Rag Blues" (extended remix) (Lancaster/Lamb) (4.50)
 "Stay The Night" (Rossi/Miller/Frost) (3.20)
 "Whatever You Want (Live At The N.E.C.)" (Parfitt/Bown) (4.21)

Charts

References 

Status Quo (band) songs
1983 singles
1983 songs
Vertigo Records singles